Abdan-e Shebaqli is a small village in Samangan Province, in northern Afghanistan. It is located east of Kholm by road.

See also
 Samangan Province

References

External links
Maplandia World Gazetteer

Populated places in Samangan Province